The 1972 Dutch Open was a combined men's and women's tennis tournament staged in Hilversum, Netherlands. The tournament was played on outdoor clay courts and was held from 1 August until 7 August 1972. It was the 16th edition of the tournament and was a non-tour event, i.e. not part of the main men's or women's circuits. John Cooper and Betty Stöve won the singles titles.

Finals

Men's singles
 John Cooper defeated  Hans Kary 6–1, 3–6, 12–10, 3–6, 6–2

Women's singles
 Betty Stöve defeated  Marijke Schaar 7–5, 6–3

Men's doubles
 Ross Case /  Geoff Masters defeated  John Cooper  Colin Dibley 8–6, 6–4

Women's doubles
 Michèle Gurdal /  Betty Stöve defeated  Lita Liem /  Lany Kaligis 6–4, 6–0

Mixed doubles
 Betty Stöve /  Bob Howe defeated  Wendy Turnbull /  Colin Dibley 2–6, 9–7, 6–3

References

Dutch Open (tennis)
Dutch Open
Dutch Open
Dutch Open (tennis), 1972